Qari Zain-Ul-Abideen is an Afghan Taliban politician and commander who is currently serving as Governor of Laghman province since August 2021.

References

Living people
Year of birth missing (living people)
Taliban governors
Taliban commanders
Governors of Laghman Province